Chalicopoma is a genus of minute, salt-tolerant snails with an operculum, aquatic gastropod mollusks, or micromollusks, in the subfamily Omphalotropidinae  of the family Assimineidae.

Species
 Chalicopoma laevigatum (Quadras & Möllendorff, 1894)
 Chalicopoma semicostulatum (Quadras & Möllendorff, 1894)

References

 Bank, R. A. (2017). Classification of the Recent freshwater/brackish Gastropoda of the World. Last update: January 24, 2018

External links
 Quadras, J. F.; Möllendorf, O. F. von. (1894). Diagnoses specierum novarum a J. F. Quadras in insulis Mariannis collectarum. Nachrichtsblatt der Deutschen Malakozoologischen Gesellschaft. 26(1-2): 13-22, 33-42

Assimineidae
Gastropod genera